Hadadezer ("[the god] Hadad is help"); also known as Adad-Idri, and possibly the same as Bar-Hadad II (Aram.) or Ben-Hadad II (Heb.), was the king of Aram Damascus between 865 and 842 BC.

The Hebrew Bible states that Hadadezer (which the biblical text calls "Ben-Hadad", but different from Ben-Hadad I and Ben-Hadad III) engaged in war against king Ahab of Israel, but was defeated and captured by him; however, soon after that the two kings signed a peace treaty and established an alliance (1 Kings 20).  

According to the Kurkh Monoliths, Hadadezer and Irhuleni of Hamath later led a coalition of eleven kings (including Ahab of Israel and Gindibu of the Arab) at the Battle of Qarqar against the Assyrian king Shalmaneser III. He fought Shalmaneser six other times, twice more with the aid of Irhuleni and with an unspecified coalition.

The biblical text reports that, after a few years, Ahab and king Jehoshaphat of Judah formed an alliance against Hadadezer, starting a war against him; however, the Aramean king was able to defeat them, and Ahab was killed during the battle (1 Kings 22).

According to the Bible (2 Kings 8) and to an inscription of the Assyrian king Shalmaneser III, Hadad-Ezer was succeeded by Hazael after his death.

See also

 List of Syrian monarchs
 Timeline of Syrian history
 Aramean kings

Notes

842 BC deaths
9th-century BC Kings of Syria
9th-century BC rulers
Aramean kings
Ancient Damascus
Year of birth unknown
Kings of Syria